Oğuz Yılmaz (born 1 January 1993) is a Turkish professional footballer who plays as a defender for Denizlispor.

Club career
Yılmaz made his Süper Lig debut in a 2–0 win over Galatasaray on 16 August 2019.

References

External links
TFF Profile
Mackolik
Mackolik Profile

1993 births
Living people
People from Şişli
Footballers from Istanbul
Turkish footballers
Pendikspor footballers
Balıkesirspor footballers
Denizlispor footballers
Association football defenders
TFF First League players
Süper Lig players